Dalnestepnoy is a rural locality (a khutor) in Kalachyovskoye Rural Settlement, Kikvidzensky District, Volgograd Oblast, Russia. The population was 14 as of 2010.

Geography 
Dalnestepnoy is located 34 km south of Preobrazhenskaya (the district's administrative centre) by road. Kalachevsky is the nearest rural locality.

References 

Rural localities in Kikvidzensky District